Bambusa procera is a species of bamboo in the tribe Bambuseae; it was described from Vietnam by Chevalier and Camus.  It is a included in the grass family, with no subspecies listed in the Catalogue of Life.

Distribution and Description 
The recorded distribution includes Cambodia and Vietnam: where the plant is called lồ ô; it is smaller than B. balcooa (tre lồ ô), which is more extensively used for construction.  

This bamboo grows as a plant from 8-12 m tall, with cylindrical, thin-walled internodes up to 550 mm long and 55 mm in diameter.  Leaves are from 200-250 mm long and 40-50 mm wide.

References

External links 

procera
Flora of Indo-China
Flora of Vietnam
Taxa named by Aimée Antoinette Camus
Taxa named by Auguste Chevalier